Sabine Quindou (born 1970) is a French journalist, known for having co-hosted the popular science education TV show C'est pas sorcier (It's not rocket science) with Jamy Gourmaud and Frédéric Courant, produced by France 3.

She presented, from 1999 to 2012, with Frédéric Courant and Jamy Gourmaud the show  C'est pas sorcier  broadcast on France 3.

She writes and performs from 2017 musical performances for orchestras of classical music.

In 2020, she writes, directs and plays in  Les petits Secrets des instruments   a proposed web series by the Auditorium de Lyon, in partnership with its artistic company. Since 2020, she has been presenting the weekly show  Thalassa  on France 3.

Biography 
Holder of a master's degree in contemporary history , she made her debut as a reporter to France 2, Europe 1 and Agence France-Presse, before leaving for Africa (Togo, Madagascar, Djibouti), working for RFO and TV5. In November 1993, she entered France 3 where she was a journalist and columnist for magazines between 1998 and 1999  C'est clair pour tout le monde .

From November 1999 to 2012, she joined Frédéric Courant and Jamy Gourmaud and co-presented the fun program for popularizing science  C'est pas sorcier  (it's not rocket science).

Since 2004, his presence in “C'est pas sorcier” has been less frequent. In 2007, she presented on France 5  Attention fragile , a program on the environment. In 2008, she toured the world for  Thalassa . At the same time, she directed documentaries for France Télévisions. In 2009, she is the host of a new dynamic attraction of Vulcania.

During the 2011-2012 season, she co-presented with Georges Pernoud and  the magazine  Thalassa  three Fridays a month in the first part of the evening on France 3.

From September 2012, she takes over the controls of the show  Transportez-moi!  On The Parliamentary Channel  once a month, until 2015. It appears in 2013 in commercials produced as a fake program on behalf of a product brand dishwasher.

In October 2015, alongside Frédéric Courant, she hosted the show "Matière à penser, matière à rêver " at Country-Hall of Liège.

She hosts    every noon on France Ô between February 2016 and January 2018.

In January 2017, she plays at the auditorium of Lyon "Souffler n'est pas jouer", an interactive and educational musical show, aimed at explaining the history and functioning of the instruments wind. She plays this show with the brass and percussion section of Orchestre national de Lyon.

In March 2018, we find her again alongside Frédéric Courant in the show “I love digital” at the Country-Hall in Liège (Belgium).

Between 2018 and 2020, she wrote, directed and performed three other musical shows accompanied by the Orchestre national de Lyon and the Orchestre national de France.

Since 2020, she presents again  Thalassa , the magazine of the sea, every Sunday on France 3.

From December 2020, she writes, directs and performs in a web series, entitled  Les petits Secrets des instruments.  This web series is offered by the Orchestre national de Lyon, in partnership with Sabine Sorcières et Compagnie, her artistic company. At the rate of one episode per week, the small Secrets of the instruments offer to discover an object essential to a musician.

She is playing from October 2021 at the Seine Musicale for a series of five shows, accompanied by the pianist Simon Zaoui.

Career

Shows 
 2017 : Souffler n'est pas jouer
 2018 : La Musique classique, c'est quoi ?
 2019 : Le Petit Guide illustré de la grande musique
 2019 : Au cœur de l'orgue
 2021 : Sabine et Simon racontent...

Television 
 1998 : C'est clair pour tout le monde (France 3)
 1999 : C'est pas la mer à boire (France 3)
 1999-2012 : C'est pas sorcier (France 3)
 2007 : Attention, fragile (France 5)
 2011-2012 and since 2020 : Thalassa (France 3)
 2012-2015 : Transportez-moi (La Chaîne parlementaire)
 2016-2018 :  (France Ô)
 2018-2019 : Inspire (France 3 Auvergne-Rhône-Alpes)

Writing and directing documentaries 
 2002 : Outre-mer, terre de feu (à l'occasion du 100è anniversaire de l’éruption du Mont-Pelé à la Martinique).co-directed with Luc Beaudonnière (RFO)
 2004 : Chambord : l’énigme de François Ier (France 5)
 2006 : Patrimoine sans frontières, du cœur historique d’Oran au Sud-marocain (France 3)
 2007 : Docteur Beligt, médecin des steppes (France 5)
 2008 : Les grands Découvreurs, en Patagonie dans le sillage de Magellan (France 3)
 2008 : Les grands Découvreurs, en Mélanésie dans le sillage de Bougainville (France 3)
 2011 : Festin sous la mer, carnet de plongées en Australie (France 3, Planète+Thalassa)
 2014 : Plongées en Pays Kanak co-written with Stéphane Jacques (Planète+Thalassa)
 2014 : Cap sur des Paradis inexplorés co-written with Stéphane Jacques (Planète+Thalassa)
 2015 : Une Semaine en Ballon, pour  en Irlande (France 3)
 2018 : Allez savoir : En Guadeloupe, comment souffle la vieille dame ? co-written with Eric Beauducel (France Ô)
 2018 : Allez savoir : En Martinique, les tortues se cachent pour grandir co-written with Eric Beauducel (France Ô)
 2018 : Songes et merveilles - La fête des lumières à Lyon (France 3)
 2019 : Lumières sur Lyon (France 3)
 2020 : Nice, le carnaval (France 3)

Distinctions 
 Mediterranéa Festival: Best TV film for Festin sous la mer, carnet de plongées en Australie
 Toiles de Mer Festival: Audience award for Festin sous la mer, carnet de plongées en Australie
 European Festival of Underwater Image and the Environment: Master Pro-Silver for Festin sous la mer, carnet de plongées en Australie 
 Association of Social Information Journalists: First prize for "Hôpital : une école de santé ?"
 Roberval Prize 2005: Winner in the audiovisual work category.

The asteroid (23890) Quindou named in his honor by NASA for its contribution to the democratization of science.

References

 https://www.sabinesorcieresetcompagnie.org/

External links

1970 births
Living people
French women journalists
French television personalities
20th-century French journalists
21st-century French journalists
People from Fort-de-France
French people of Martiniquais descent
20th-century French women
21st-century French women